Sushi Striker: The Way of Sushido is an action-puzzle video game developed by indieszero. The game was released worldwide for the Nintendo 3DS and Nintendo Switch on June 8, 2018. Sushi Striker takes place in a world where sushi has been made forbidden by its ruling empire. The protagonist, Musashi, attempts to revert this ban on sushi. The game consists of one-on-one battles with CPU-controlled opponents, where the player must match sushi plates of the same color on a series of conveyor belts to cause damage to the opponent.

Sushi Striker received generally positive reviews from critics who praised its gameplay, anime-inspired art style, and story, but criticised the game length and controls.

Gameplay 

Sushi Striker: The Way of Sushido is a game where the player battles against opponents with sushi in order to defeat them. In battle, both the player and the opponent face each other, with conveyor belts of sushi, resembling sushi trains, between them. The player must match as many sushi plates of the same color as possible in order to gather them. Musashi will eat the sushi off the plates, and the plates will attack the opponent, causing their health to decrease. This is also how the opponent attacks. The player and the opponent have three conveyor belts each to match sushi on, as well as one conveyor between them, for both to use. The game also offers online multiplayer.

Plot 

The game takes place in a world without fish, where the Republic and the Empire have long battled over control of sushi in a war known as the Sushi Struggles. In this world, sushi is created by mysterious creatures known as "sushi sprites", and the people who fight alongside them (by throwing the plates used to serve the sushi) are known as "sushi strikers." Following the defeat of the Republic in the Sushi Struggles, the Empire forbids the discussion and consumption of sushi within the borders of the subjugated Republic.

The player takes on the role of a character named Musashi (whose gender may be set by the player; male Musashi is voiced by Nicholas Roye, and female Musashi is voiced by Cristina Vee), an orphan growing up in the Republic. One day, while attempting to gather food for hungry children in the orphanage where they grew up, Musashi comes across a sushi striker named Franklin (Brad Venable) and his partner sprite, Ara-o (Jewels Jaselle). Although Musashi initially hates sushi due to losing their parents in the Sushi Struggles, their extreme hunger forces them to accept an offer from Franklin to try out some sushi. Thrilled by its taste, Musashi resolves to spread the word of sushi to everyone, and asks Franklin to follow them home to feed the orphanage's children as a first step. Before they can return home, however, Franklin and Ara-o are captured by Imperial general Kodiak (Walt Gray) and taken away for interrogation.

Alone and hungry once more, Musashi hears a distant voice leading them to a nearby shrine where their hunger can be satiated. The voice encourages Musashi to eat the sushi that is produced from the shrine. After doing so, the voice reveals itself to be Jinrai (Dave Fennoy), a sushi sprite in hiding who is highly sought after by the Empire. By accepting the sushi, Musashi unknowingly pledges themself with Jinrai, and the two agree to band together in order to rescue Franklin and spread the good word of sushi.

Along the way, Musashi and Jinrai encounter members of the Sushi Liberation Front, a resistance force opposing the Empire's subjugation and its hoarding of sushi. Musashi agrees to join the Sushi Liberation Front, and is able to drive Kodiak's forces out of Republic territory. Pressing their advantage into Imperial territory, the Sushi Liberation Front eventually reaches Fort Fugu, an Imperial stronghold being held by the Empire's top general, a legendary sushi striker named Tiburon (Vegas J. Jenkins). As Musashi faces Tiburon, however, Tiburon unleashes his ultimate technique known as Sushido (a way of consuming sushi in a manner so poetic it freezes enemies in place). While frozen, Tiburon reveals that he is, in fact, Musashi's father Jubay. He reveals he defected from the Sushi Liberation Front once he had learned of a dark secret within; this had also led Musashi's mother to throw herself beyond the great shrine gate where sushi came from in despair. Once Tiburon leaves, Musashi confronts Masa (T. Axelrod), the leader of the Sushi Liberation Front, on the matter, and is incensed to learn that the soldiers of the Sushi Liberation Front are trained to discard the rice and eat only the tastiest part of the sushi, in order to improve their abilities. Finding this to be a travesty, Musashi challenges and defeats Masa to claim leadership of the Sushi Liberation Front, declaring that sushi must be respected and consumed in its entirety.

Soon after, Musashi learns where Franklin is being kept prisoner. Musashi heads alone to the distant facility where Franklin is imprisoned, and discovers that it is a torture facility, where prisoners are force-fed an endless stream of wasabi. After defeating Kodiak, who had been reassigned there after again losing the Republic's territory, Musashi is able to rescue Franklin. However, due to extensive torture, Franklin is no longer able to continue being a sushi striker. Ara-o asks Musashi to pledge with it in order to continue Franklin's dream that Musashi had inherited. In doing so, Musashi masters their own form of Sushido, and is able to challenge Tiburon in combat once more.

The Sushi Liberation Front breaches the heart of Imperial territory, and Musashi defeats Tiburon in combat. Tiburon is forced to admit defeat, and, rejoining the Sushi Liberation Front under his former name of Jubay, tries to convince child emperor Octavius (Griffin Burns) to surrender peacefully. However, Octavius has been traumatized by the fact that he had long been denied sushi by his own parents, and goes insane, leading to a climactic battle. After a long struggle, the emperor is defeated, and despite Musashi attempting to make peace by sharing a plate of sushi with him, the emperor chooses to depart to, according to Jinrai, "the place where sushi comes from".

With the emperor defeated, the land is at peace once more, and the people of the land, in both the Empire and the Republic, are free to enjoy sushi. Jinrai finally reveals to Musashi that sushi originally came from the fish in the sea, but due to human activity, the fish slowly became extinct, and were reincarnated into sushi sprites. The sushi sprites are able to maintain their strength and continue to produce sushi through the people's appreciation and gratitude for sushi; values that Musashi must treasure and cherish every time sushi is consumed. The story ends with Musashi and Jubay living out their lives together in peace, hoping that some day, Musashi's mother will return, so they can become a family once more.

Development and release 
Development began when Nintendo producer, Hitoshi Yamagami, asked Tokyo Mirage Sessions ♯FE director, Kaori Ando, for ideas on new Nintendo 3DS and Nintendo Switch software, Ando pitched an idea for a game about eating sushi. Although confused by the concept, he and the team eventually worked to flesh out the concept, conceiving the characters, the general premise for the game, as well as writing the story. Nintendo then shopped the project around to four potential co-development partners. indieszero, who had previously worked with Nintendo on NES Remix and Electroplankton, was the last company approached, and they suggested to make it a puzzle game. The puzzle game indeszero pitched was different from the final product. Nintendo and indieszero then worked to refine and finalize the core mechanics for the game.

Sushi Striker: The Way of Sushido was initially announced at E3 2017 as a Nintendo 3DS exclusive title. The game was later featured in a March 2018 Nintendo Direct presentation, with the announcement of a Nintendo Switch version as well as online multiplayer. The game was released worldwide on June 8, 2018.

Reception

Sushi Striker: The Way of Sushido received "generally favorable reviews" according to the review aggregator Metacritic. Critics praised the general puzzle gameplay of the levels, but criticized the lengthy campaign and the awkward controls.

Neal Ronaghan of Nintendo World Report praised the feel of the sushi-combining mechanics saying that "it became second nature to zoom around the board". Ryan Craddock of Nintendo Life appreciated the game's anime aesthetic and how the abilities of each of the Sushi Sprites allowed the player to change their playstyle. Kyle Hilliard, writing for Game Informer, enjoyed the combos that the game allowed the player to create, although he criticized the controls as not being accurate enough, whether using the touch screen or the cursor. Kevin Knezevic of GameSpot enjoyed the game's story, calling it absurd but charming.

Sales
Within its first week, the game sold 5,325 copies for the Nintendo Switch and 2,392 copies for the Nintendo 3DS in Japan.

Notes

References

External links 

2018 video games
Action video games
Indieszero games
Multiplayer and single-player video games
Nintendo 3DS eShop games
Nintendo 3DS games
Nintendo Entertainment Planning & Development games
Nintendo games
Nintendo Network games
Nintendo Switch games
Puzzle video games
Video games about food and drink
Video games developed in Japan
Video games featuring protagonists of selectable gender